The Men's 110 metres hurdles event at the 1976 Summer Olympics in Montreal was held on July 26, 1976, and on July 28, 1976. Twenty-four athletes from 17 nations competed. The maximum number of athletes per nation had been set at 3 since the 1930 Olympic Congress. 

The event was won by Guy Drut of France, the sixth man to win two medals in the event (silver in 1972). It was France's first championship in the men's high hurdles, and only the third time the event was won by a hurdler not from the United States. Alejandro Casañas's silver gave Cuba its first medal in the event. Willie Davenport took bronze, becoming the seventh man to win a second medal and the first to do so in non-consecutive Games (he had won gold in 1968). It was the first time in Olympic history that the United States failed to win either gold or silver in the event; the Americans had won the last 9 straight editions of the event and 15 of 17 overall, with silver (and bronze) medals in the other two times (1920 and 1928).

Background

This was the 18th appearance of the event, which is one of 12 athletics events to have been held at every Summer Olympics. Three finalists from 1972 returned: silver medalist Guy Drut of France, fourth-place finisher Willie Davenport of the United States (also a 1964 semifinalist and the 1968 gold medalist), and fifth-place finisher Frank Siebeck of East Germany. Drut was the 1974 European champion and the favorite, with 1975 Pan-Am champion Alejandro Casañas of Cuba his most significant challenger. Davenport was still a strong hurdler but out of his prime in his fourth Olympics; none of the other American hurdlers were dominant either.

Antigua and Barbuda and Kuwait each made their first appearance in the event. The United States made its 18th appearance, the only nation to have competed in the 110 metres hurdles in each Games to that point.

Competition format

The competition continued to use the three-round format used since 1908 (except 1960, which had four rounds) and eight-man semifinals and finals, as well as the "fastest loser" system, used since 1964. The first round consisted of three heats, with 8 hurdlers each. The top five hurdlers in each heat, along with the next fastest overall, advanced to the semifinals. The 16 semifinalists were divided into two semifinals of 8 hurdlers each; the top four hurdlers in each advanced to the 8-man final.

Records

These were the standing world and Olympic records (in seconds) prior to the 1976 Summer Olympics. Hand-timed records were official in 1976, but the auto-timed result of 13.24 by Milburn in the 1972 Olympic final would be recognized as the world record in 1977 when the IAAF switched to recognizing auto-timed results.

Schedule

All times are Eastern Daylight Time (UTC-4)

Results

Round 1

The first round was held on July 26, 1976.

Heat 1

Heat 2

Heat 3

Semifinals

The semifinals were held on July 28, 1976.

Semifinal 1

Semifinal 2

Final

The final was held on July 28, 1976.

See also
 1972 Men's Olympic 110 metres hurdles (Munich)
 1978 Men's European Championships 110 metres hurdles (Prague)
 1980 Men's Olympic 110 metres hurdles (Moscow)

References

 1
Sprint hurdles at the Olympics
Men's events at the 1976 Summer Olympics